"Love Like Candy Floss" (stylized as "Love like candy floss") is a song by Japanese girl group Sweets, released as their 3rd single on February 11, 2004.

Background and release

"Love Like Candy Floss" is a mid-pop tune composed by Bounceback, with lyrics written by Romantic High. The single was released on February 11, 2004 under Avex Trax. The song was used as the theme song in the commercial for Circle K's bakery and as a theme song on the television show Shiodome Style. The song's theme was described as "falling in love with a friend."

Music video

The music video was filmed in Nagano, making it the first of their videos to be filmed outside of a studio, and was described as "drama-like", featuring Haruna following an older man. The music video was featured on the television show Pop Jam for four weeks.

Reception
"Love Like Candy Floss" reached #26 on the Oricon Weekly Singles Chart. CDJournal described the song as having a "fantastic and magical mood" that was "danceable", and that listeners can feel the "sparkle of adolescent girls through each and every emotion expressed in their voices."

Track listing

Charts

Tokyo Girls' Style version

Background and release

Tokyo Girls' Style, who had performed Sweets' songs at concerts before, released "Love Like Candy Floss" as their 5th single on February 11, 2011. The song was re-arranged by Hiroshi Matsui and categorized as dance-pop. It was used as a theme song for the television show Music Dragon Gate. The single was released in four different versions with different CD covers: a CD-only standard version, a standard version with an exclusive DVD, and two versions with limited edition DVDs.

Reception

"Love Like Candy Floss" peaked at #20 on the Oricon Weekly Singles Chart. CDJournal described the "sour-sweet melody" as "leaving behind a refreshing echo."

Track listing

Charts

References

2004 singles
2004 songs
2011 singles
2011 songs
Japanese-language songs